The 2006–07 A1 Grand Prix of Nations, Czech Republic was an A1 Grand Prix race, held on October 8, 2006, at Masaryk Circuit near Brno, Czech Republic. This was the second race in the 2006-07 A1 Grand Prix season.

Report

Practice

Qualifying

Sprint race

Main race

Results

Qualification
Qualification took place on Saturday, October 7, 2006

* After qualifying, the A1 Team Great Britain car was found to be 4 mm over the maximum width, and the stewards disallowed the team's fastest qualifying time.

Sprint Race Results
The Sprint Race took place on Sunday, October 8, 2006

Feature Race Results
The Feature Race took place on Sunday, October 8, 2006

Total Points
Total points awarded:

 Fastest Lap: Alex Yoong, A1 Team Malaysia, 1'47.296 on lap 2 of Sprint Race

References

Czech Republic
A1 Grand Prix
Motorsport competitions in the Czech Republic